Jakob Kreuzer (born 15 January 1995) is an Austrian footballer who plays for Union Gurten.

External links

Austrian footballers
Austrian Football Bundesliga players
2. Liga (Austria) players
Austrian Regionalliga players
SV Ried players
FC Blau-Weiß Linz players
1995 births
Living people
Association football forwards